Millwood is a rural locality in the Toowoomba Region, Queensland, Australia. In the  Millwood had a population of 23 people.

History 
The name Millwood was coined by local farmer, Tom Twidale, by combining Mill from Millmerran and wood from Inglewood as the locality lay between those two towns.

Millwood Provisional School opened on 23 October 1944. In January 1960 it became Millwood State School. It closed on 25 June 1965.

In the  Millwood had a population of 23 people.

Road infrastructure
The Millmerran–Inglewood Road (State Route 82) runs through from north-east to south.

References 

Toowoomba Region
Localities in Queensland